Argvani is a rural locality (a selo) and the administrative centre of Argvaninsky Selsoviet, Gumbetovsky District, Republic of Dagestan, Russia. The population was 796 as of 2010. There are 5 streets.

Geography 
Argvani is located 14 km northeast of Mekhelta (the district's administrative centre) by road. Tlyarata and Novoye Argvani are the nearest rural localities.

References 

Rural localities in Gumbetovsky District